Habboûch is a populated area in southern Lebanon. The population is estimated to be approximately 15,000.It is located at latitude: 33.4072900 and longitude: 35.4816900

History

In 1875 Victor Guérin found the village to be inhabited by 200 Metualis.

References

Bibliography

External links
 Municipality of Habbouch 
Habbouch, Localiban

Populated places in Nabatieh District
Shia Muslim communities in Lebanon